Hoefler&Co. (H&Co) is a digital type foundry (font design studio) in Woburn, Massachusetts (formerly New York City), founded by type designer Jonathan Hoefler. H&Co designs typefaces for clients and for retail on its website.

The company was founded in 1989, initially focusing on editorial commissions for publications such as The New York Times, Martha Stewart Living, The Wall Street Journal, Esquire, Rolling Stone, Sports Illustrated, Harper's Bazaar, Wired and Condé Nast Portfolio, and commissions for companies such as Tiffany & Co., Nike, Inc., and Hewlett Packard. It has worked with a number of prominent cultural institutions in New York City, including the headquarters of the United Nations, the Guggenheim Museum, the Whitney Museum, Lever House, Radio City Music Hall, The Public Theater, and The New York Jets. Because of its inspiration from New York City history, its Gotham typeface was selected in 2004 for the cornerstone of One World Trade Center, built on the World Trade Center site. 

Incorporated as The Hoefler Type Foundry (HTF), in 2005 the company rebranded as Hoefler & Frere-Jones (H&FJ), and in 2014 as Hoefler&Co (H&Co).

In September 2021 Hoefler announced the company's sale to Monotype, with Hoefler and CEO Carleen Borsella leaving the company.

Work

The company specializes in designing original typefaces, often comprehensive type families that include a range of styles or characters: its Gotham typeface for GQ extends to 74 for print alone, and its Surveyor/Obsidian family past 100. Many H&Co typefaces take inspiration from historical models, and under-examined aspects of typography and lettering, such as Soviet house numbers, metal lettering on bus terminals, engraved maps, and old petrol pumps. Bloomberg Businessweek commented that Hoefler and Frere-Jones bonded over a dislike of "so-called grunge typography, which trafficked in angst and messiness. Neither Frere-Jones nor Hoefler took to that trend, preferring a cleaner style based on historic typefaces."

The company's work has been profiled in The New York Times, Time, Esquire, Wallpaper, and Wired, as well as the design publications Baseline, CAP & Design, CreativePro, Communication Arts, Desktop, Eye, Design, Graphis Inc., I.D., IDEA, IdN, Metropolis, Page, Print, Publish, and +81. H&Co's work is part of the permanent collections of both the Smithsonian Institution and the Victoria & Albert Museum, and it has been recognized by the American Institute of Graphic Arts and the National Design Awards.

Notable uses
The Gotham typeface became famous during 2008, when it was chosen for the identity of Barack Obama during his campaign for the presidency. The Ringside typeface was used in the Elizabeth Warren 2020 presidential campaign and the Mercury and Decimal typefaces were used in the Joe Biden 2020 presidential campaign as well as during the Presidency of Joe Biden (2020-). H&Co typefaces associated with cultural institutions include Knockout (for The Public Theatre), Ideal Sans (The Art Institute of Chicago), Verlag (The Guggenheim Museum) and Whitney (The Whitney Museum). H&Co's Ringside typeface is the official typeface of The Office of Barack and Michelle Obama.

Awards
Jonathan Hoefler was the recipient of the 2002 Prix Charles Peignot, awarded by the Association Typographique Internationale (ATypI) for outstanding contributions to typeface design. In 2009, the company became the first typeface designers to be recognized by the National Design Awards.

Conflict between Hoefler and Frere-Jones
On January 16, 2014, designer Tobias Frere-Jones, who had worked with the company since 1999, filed a lawsuit in the courts of New York state against Jonathan Hoefler. The lawsuit alleged that Frere-Jones was entitled to own half of the type foundry, based on an oral agreement made in 1999. According to this alleged agreement, Frere-Jones transferred ownership of his fonts to the company for 10 USD and the company was renamed Hoefler & Frere-Jones. Frere-Jones contends that the foundry was intended to be run as an equal partnership. Hoefler filed a motion to dismiss, refuting Frere-Jones's account by attaching the written agreement signed by himself and Frere-Jones. The lawsuit was settled on September 28, 2014, its terms undisclosed.

List of typefaces
 Archer
 Champion Gothic
 Gotham
Hoefler Text and display variant Hoefler Titling
Inkwell
Obsidian
Operator
Quarto
 Requiem
 Surveyor
 Verlag
 Whitney

References

 iapps.courts.state.ny.us
 Parascope
 New York Times 
 iapps.courts.state.ny.us

External links
 
 Catalogue of typefaces designed
 

Commercial type foundries
Companies established in 1989
Graphic design studios